The meridian 138° east of Greenwich is a line of longitude that extends from the North Pole across the Arctic Ocean, Asia, the Pacific Ocean, Australasia, the Indian Ocean, the Southern Ocean, and Antarctica to the South Pole.

The 138th meridian east forms a great circle with the 42nd meridian west.

In Australia, the border between the Northern Territory and Queensland approximates the meridian. The border runs north from Poeppel Corner at a bearing of 359° 59' 30", reaching the Gulf of Carpentaria several hundred meters west of the meridian.

From Pole to Pole
Starting at the North Pole and heading south to the South Pole, the 138th meridian east passes through:

{| class="wikitable plainrowheaders"
! scope="col" width="130" | Co-ordinates
! scope="col" | Country, territory or sea
! scope="col" | Notes
|-
| style="background:#b0e0e6;" | 
! scope="row" style="background:#b0e0e6;" | Arctic Ocean
| style="background:#b0e0e6;" |
|-
| 
! scope="row" | 
| Sakha Republic — Kotelny Island, New Siberian Islands
|-
| style="background:#b0e0e6;" | 
! scope="row" style="background:#b0e0e6;" | Laptev Sea
| style="background:#b0e0e6;" |
|-valign="top"
| 
! scope="row" | 
| Sakha Republic — Yarok Island and the mainland Khabarovsk Krai — from 
|-
| style="background:#b0e0e6;" | 
! scope="row" style="background:#b0e0e6;" | Sea of Okhotsk
| style="background:#b0e0e6;" |
|-
| 
! scope="row" | 
| Khabarovsk Krai — Bolshoy Shantar Island
|-
| style="background:#b0e0e6;" | 
! scope="row" style="background:#b0e0e6;" | Sea of Okhotsk
| style="background:#b0e0e6;" |
|-valign="top"
| 
! scope="row" | 
| Khabarovsk Krai Primorsky Krai — from  Khabarovsk Krai — from  Primorsky Krai — from  Khabarovsk Krai — from  Primorsky Krai — from 
|-valign="top"
| style="background:#b0e0e6;" | 
! scope="row" style="background:#b0e0e6;" | Sea of Japan
| style="background:#b0e0e6;" | Passing just west of Sado island, Niigata Prefecture,  (at )
|-valign="top"
| 
! scope="row" | 
|-valign="top"
| style="background:#b0e0e6;" | 
! scope="row" style="background:#b0e0e6;" | Pacific Ocean
| style="background:#b0e0e6;" | Passing just west of Yap island,  (at )
|-
| 
! scope="row" | 
| Island of New Guinea
|-
| style="background:#b0e0e6;" | 
! scope="row" style="background:#b0e0e6;" | Arafura Sea
| style="background:#b0e0e6;" |
|-
| 
! scope="row" | 
| Island of Yos Sudarso
|-
| style="background:#b0e0e6;" | 
! scope="row" style="background:#b0e0e6;" | Arafura Sea
| style="background:#b0e0e6;" |
|-
| style="background:#b0e0e6;" | 
! scope="row" style="background:#b0e0e6;" | Gulf of Carpentaria
| style="background:#b0e0e6;" |
|-valign="top"
| 
! scope="row" | 
| Northern Territory / Queensland border (approximately) South Australia — from 
|-
| style="background:#b0e0e6;" | 
! scope="row" style="background:#b0e0e6;" | Gulf St Vincent
| style="background:#b0e0e6;" |
|-
| 
! scope="row" | 
| South Australia — Kangaroo Island
|-
| style="background:#b0e0e6;" | 
! scope="row" style="background:#b0e0e6;" | Indian Ocean
| style="background:#b0e0e6;" | Australian authorities consider this to be part of the Southern Ocean
|-
| style="background:#b0e0e6;" | 
! scope="row" style="background:#b0e0e6;" | Southern Ocean
| style="background:#b0e0e6;" |
|-
| 
! scope="row" | Antarctica
| Adélie Land, claimed by 
|-
|}

References

See also
137th meridian east
139th meridian east

e138 meridian east
Borders of the Northern Territory
Borders of Queensland